Richard "Pepe" Benedict (born Riccardo Benedetto, January 8, 1920 – April 25, 1984) was an Italian-American television and film actor and director. He was born in Palermo, Italy.

He appeared in dozens of television programs and movies from the 1940s to the 1960s, most notably Ace in the Hole (1951), directed by Billy Wilder. Benedict appeared with Frank Sinatra and the Rat Pack in the 1960 movie Ocean's 11 as one of the 11 men who rob five Las Vegas casinos on the same night. He also played the commander of the Mars rescue ship in the 1958 B sci-fi movie It! The Terror from Beyond Space.

Benedict's television appearances included Adventures of Superman, The Lone Ranger, Perry Mason, Zorro, Dragnet, Peter Gunn and Hawaii Five-O. His directing credits included Impasse, an adventure film starring Burt Reynolds.

He died of a heart attack at Studio City, Los Angeles, on April 25, 1984, and was interred in Forest Lawn – Hollywood Hills Cemetery, in the Churchyard section. He was the father of three children, including actor Nick Benedict.

Filmography

References

External links

1920 births
1984 deaths
American male film actors
American film directors
American male television actors
American television directors
American television writers
American male television writers
Burials at Forest Lawn Memorial Park (Hollywood Hills)
Italian emigrants to the United States
20th-century American male actors
Male actors from Palermo
20th-century American screenwriters
20th-century American male writers
American people of Italian descent